Polanica-Zdrój  is a spa town in Kłodzko County, Lower Silesian Voivodeship, in south-western Poland. As at 2021, the town has a population of 6110.

History

Polanica-Zdrój was first documented in 1347 under the name Heyde, when it was part of the Kingdom of Bohemia. At the time it belonged to the House of Glaubitz, and in the following centuries it often changed owners. From the end of the 16th century the village was co-owned by the Jesuits, who contributed to its development. In 1645 it was destroyed by Swedish troops during the Thirty Years' War. In 1742 the settlement – like all the area – was annexed by the Kingdom of Prussia. The settlement grew quickly during the 19th century, becoming a popular health resort in the 1870s, after Prussia had become a component state of Germany in 1871. In 1890 a rail connection to Glatz (Kłodzko) was completed. Until 1933, that is the year the Nazis came to power in Germany, a Polish guesthouse existed in the town. During both world wars the sanatoria were turned into military hospitals. The town became part of Poland after World War II. It was granted town rights in 1945 and its first mayor was Kazimierz Dąbrowski.

On 28 June 1972 the Catholic parishes of Polanica-Zdrój were redeployed from the traditional Hradec Králové diocese (est. 1664; Ecclesiastical Province of Bohemia) into the Archdiocese of Wrocław.

The amateur film festival POL-8 takes place in Polanica-Zdrój. Since 1963, it has hosted the annual Akiba Rubinstein Memorial chess tournament, honoring the great Polish Grandmaster (1882–1961). This event always attracts a high-class field of top players.

Numbers of inhabitants:

1787 – 443
1816 – 490
1880 – 527
1910 - 1,538
1933 - 1,831
1950 - 4,482
1960 - 6,514
1970 - 6,943
1978 - 7,399
2006 - 6,900

Surroundings
 Historical city of Kłodzko with the Kłodzko Fortress with  de galleries & the Saint John bridge (called a "Charles Bridge of Prague in miniature") from 1390, as well as its houses from the 15th and 16th century
 Spa resorts in Duszniki-Zdrój, Kudowa-Zdrój & Lądek-Zdrój
 Śnieżnik Mountains & Stołowe Mountains 
 Medieval town of Niemcza
 Cistercian monastery at Henryków
 Wojsławice Arboretum

Twin towns – sister cities

Polanica-Zdrój is twinned with:
 Česká Skalice, Czech Republic
 Janské Lázně, Czech Republic
 Telgte, Germany
 Kartuzy, Poland
 Comacchio, Italy

Gallery

See also
List of spa towns in Poland

References

External links

 Official web site, in Polish, English and German
 Jewish Community in Polanica-Zdrój on Virtual Shtetl

Cities and towns in Lower Silesian Voivodeship
Kłodzko County
Spa towns in Poland